Hugh McNeal Blacklock (January 1, 1893January 9, 1954) was an American football player.  He played college football at the tackle and fullback positions at Michigan Agricultural College from 1913 to 1916.  He also played seven years in the National Football League (NFL) at the tackle, guard and center positions. He played for the Decatur Staleys, the Chicago Staleys, the Chicago Bears and the Brooklyn Lions.

References

External links
 Hugh Blacklock Bio (Staley Museum)
 

1893 births
1954 deaths
American football tackles
Brooklyn Lions players
Great Lakes Navy Bluejackets football players
Chicago Bears players
Chicago Staleys players
Decatur Staleys players
Michigan State Spartans football players
People from East Grand Rapids, Michigan
Players of American football from Grand Rapids, Michigan